Wan Mohammad Faiz bin Wan Sulaiman (born 11 July 1992) is a Malaysian professional footballer who plays as a midfielder for Malaysian club Penang.

References

External links
 

Living people
1992 births
People from Kelantan
Malaysian footballers
Association football midfielders
UKM F.C. players
Penang F.C. players
Malaysia Super League players